Gianfranco Facco-Bonetti (born 1940 in Galeata, Italy) is an Italian diplomat and is the current Ambassador Extraordinary and Plenipotentiary of the Sovereign Military Order of Malta to the Russian Federation.

Biography
Facco-Bonetti was the Ambassador of Italy to Russia from 2001 until 2006. He returned to Moscow in 2008, when he was appointed as Ambassador of the Sovereign Military Order of Malta to Russia, presenting his Letter of Credence to then-President of Russia Vladimir Putin on 22 April 2008.

Facco-Bonetti was the president of the United World College of the Adriatic.

Honors
 Grand Officer of the Order of Merit of the Italian Republic – June 2, 2000

See also
 Ministry of Foreign Affairs (Italy)
 Foreign relations of Italy

References

External links

1940 births
Living people
Ambassadors of Italy to Russia
Ambassadors of the Sovereign Military Order of Malta to Russia
Italian diplomats
20th-century diplomats